Mégantic—Frontenac was a federal electoral district in the province of Quebec, Canada, that was represented in the House of Commons of Canada from 1935 to 1949.

This riding was created in 1933 from Mégantic and Richmond—Wolfe ridings. It consisted of:
 the county of Mégantic except that part as is included in the municipalities of Leeds, Leeds East, St-Jacques-de-Leeds, Nelson, Ste-Anastasie-de-Nelson and the village of Lyster;
 that part of the county of Frontenac as is included in the municipalities of Courcelles, St-Vital-de-Lambton, St-Evariste-de-Forsyth, St-Méthode-d'Adstock, St-Sébastien and the villages of Lambton and St-Evariste Station;
 that part of the county of Wolfe as is included in the municipalities of Garthby, Stratford, Wolfestown, D'Israeli and the villages of Beaulac and D'Israeli.

It was abolished in 1947 when it was redistributed into Beauce, Compton—Frontenac and Mégantic ridings.

Members of Parliament

This riding elected the following Members of Parliament:

Election results

See also 

 List of Canadian federal electoral districts
 Past Canadian electoral districts

External links 
 Riding history from the Library of Parliament

Former federal electoral districts of Quebec